Tropidozineus amabilis is a species of beetle in the family Cerambycidae. It was described by Monne in 1991.

References

Tropidozineus
Beetles described in 1991